The 2013 Hungaroring GP2 Series round was a GP2 Series motor race held on July 28 and 29, 2013 at Hungaroring, Hungary. It was the seventh round of the 2013 GP2 season. The race supported the 2013 Hungarian Grand Prix.

Classification

Qualifying

Feature race

Sprint race

See also 
 2013 Hungarian Grand Prix
 2013 Hungaroring GP3 Series round

References 

Hungaroring
GP2